Péni is a department or commune of Houet Province in south-western Burkina Faso. Its capital lies at the town of Péni.

Towns and villages
The department is composed by the seat, the town of Péni, and 23 villages: Dabokiri, Dissini, Dodougou, Dogossesso, Donfara, Dounousso, Finlande, Gnafongo, Kodara, Koumandara, Lanfiera, Marabagasso, Me, Moussobadougou, Nakaka, Nongondougou, Noumoudara, Samaradougou, Sokourani, Taga, Tapokadeni, Tien and Tiemeredji-Gouegoue.

References

Departments of Burkina Faso
Houet Province